Strabala acuminata is a species of flea beetle in the family Chrysomelidae. It is found in North America.

Subspecies
These two subspecies belong to the species Strabala acuminata:
 Strabala acuminata acuminata Blake, 1953
 Strabala acuminata costaricensis Blake

References

Further reading

 
 

Alticini
Articles created by Qbugbot
Beetles described in 1953